Adela Stanisława Dankowska (born 5 January 1935 in Sobienie-Jeziory) is a retired Polish aviator and politician. She was a glider pilot and the coach of the Polish national gliding team, and also served as a member of Parliament.

Biography 
Dankowska was born in Sobienie-Jeziory in Lublin Voivodeship, Poland. She studied biology at the Warsaw University of Life Sciences, graduating in 1959, and learnt to fly at the Aero Club of Warsaw.

She held 12 world records during her flying career, and 43 Polish records, including the world record for distance travelled in a straight line, in 1977 (837 km) and the women's world record for height gain, in 1967 (8,430 m). She also held the record for the longest glider flight in Poland, reaching a distance of 837 km in 1974.

From 1989 to 1991 Dankowska served as a member of the Parliament of Poland. She has also served on the city council of Leźno and the city's regional council.

She is a member of the National Council of Aviation and a member of the Air National Examination Board.

Recognition 
In 1970, Dankowska received the Polish Silver Cross of Merit, and in 1975 she received the Lilienthal Gliding Medal for her achievements in the sport. In 1977 she received a medal from the province of Leszno and in 1978 she received the Knight's Cross of the Order of Polonia Restituta. In 1981 she received the Medal of the National Education Commission (in Polish, Medal Komisji Edukacji Narodowej). She has also received six Gold Medals for outstanding achievements in sport.

References

1935 births
Living people
People from Otwock County
People from Lublin Voivodeship (1919–1939)
Solidarity Citizens' Committee politicians
Civic Platform politicians
Members of the Contract Sejm
20th-century Polish women politicians
Polish aviators
Polish glider pilots
Lilienthal Gliding Medal recipients
Knights of the Order of Polonia Restituta
20th-century Polish women
Women aviators